At Your Service is a greatest hits album by Melody Club released on August 21, 2007.

Track listing
Palace Station
Take Me Away
Covergirl
Baby
Killing a Boy
Cats in the Dark
Stranded Love
Breakaway
Let's Kill the Clockwork
Electric
Play Me in Stereo
Wildhearts

References

2007 greatest hits albums
Compilation albums by Swedish artists
Melody Club albums